The discography of Le Tigre, an American electro–punk band, consists of three studio albums, seven extended plays, four singles, one video album and seven music videos. Le Tigre was formed in 1998 by Kathleen Hanna, Johanna Fateman and Sadie Benning. The band is known for its left-wing sociopolitical lyrics, dealing with issues of feminism and the LGBT community.

The band's self-titled debut album was released in October 1999. In 2000, Benning left the group to pursue a career as a film director. She was replaced by JD Samson on Le Tigre's second studio album Feminist Sweepstakes. Released in October 2001, it is a hybrid of genres, combining hip hop, dance and punk music. In the United States, the album reached number 43 on the Billboard Independent Albums chart.

After signing a recording contract with Universal Records, Le Tigre released their major label debut, This Island, in October 2004. The album reached number 130 on the US Billboard 200 and number five on the Billboard Top Heatseekers chart. It produced three singles, two of which reached the top 75 of the United Kingdom singles chart. In 2007, the band announced that it was taking "an extended break from all things Le Tigre".

Albums

Studio albums

Extended plays

Singles

Other appearances

Remixes

Videography

Video albums

Music videos

Notes

A  Le Tigre was reissued on August 24, 2004 in the United States with four songs recorded live at the BBC.
B  Feminist Sweepstakes was reissued on August 24, 2004 in the US with additional video content. 
C  From the Desk of Mr. Lady was reissued on August 24, 2004 in the US with an enhanced content.
D  Remix was reissued on August 24, 2004 in the US with an additional remix.

References

External links

 

Le Tigre
Rock music group discographies